The fifth season of Fear the Walking Dead, an American horror-drama television series on AMC, premiered on June 2, 2019, and concluded on September 29, 2019, consisting of sixteen episodes. The series is a companion series to The Walking Dead, which is based on the comic book series of the same name by Robert Kirkman, Tony Moore, and Charlie Adlard, with the season containing the second crossover character between the two series with the introduction of Dwight (Austin Amelio), the first being Morgan Jones in the fourth season. The executive producers are Kirkman, David Alpert, Greg Nicotero, Gale Anne Hurd, Scott M. Gimple, Andrew Chambliss, and Ian B. Goldberg, with Chambliss and Goldberg as showrunners for the second consecutive season.

The season follows the group of survivors led by Morgan Jones (Lennie James) and Alicia Clark (Alycia Debnam-Carey) as they search for other survivors, looking to provide help for others in an effort to make up for the wrongdoings from their pasts.

Cast
The fifth season featured eleven actors receiving main cast billing status, with eight returning from the fourth season, while three new cast members are introduced. Rubén Blades returned in the fifth season as Daniel Salazar, who didn't appear at all in the fourth season. Austin Amelio (who was a main cast member in The Walking Dead), moved to the main cast after his departure from The Walking Dead. Alexa Nisenson was promoted from recurring status and Karen David was added to the main cast. This was the first season not to include Kim Dickens and Frank Dillane, who were both credited as main cast members in previous seasons.

Main cast

 Lennie James as Morgan Jones: A pragmatic man, formerly a part of Rick Grimes' group on The Walking Dead, who leads a pacifist agenda.
 Alycia Debnam-Carey as Alicia Clark: The fiery yet compassionate daughter of Madison, and Nick's sister.
 Maggie Grace as Althea "Al" Szewczyk-Przygocki: A curious and tactical journalist.
 Colman Domingo as Victor Strand: A smart and sophisticated conman-turned-businessman, who formed friendships with Madison and Alicia.
 Danay García as Luciana Galvez: A strong and cautious former member of the La Colonia community in Tijuana, Mexico, and Nick's former girlfriend.
 Garret Dillahunt as John Dorie: A lonesome and friendly police officer who is in a relationship with June.
 Alexa Nisenson as Charlie: A young girl who was a spy for the Vultures until she defected to Morgan's group.
 Jenna Elfman as June: A kind nurse who is in a relationship with John.
 Rubén Blades as Daniel Salazar: A courageous and pragmatic former Sombra Negra member, previously missing since the destruction of the Gonzales dam.
 Karen David as Grace Mukherjee: A mysterious woman who used to work at a nuclear power plant that melted down near the site where the plane of Morgan's group crashed.
 Austin Amelio as Dwight: A reluctant former lieutenant of the Saviors, who was exiled from Virginia by Rick Grimes' group on The Walking Dead. He is currently searching for his missing wife Sherry, who disappeared after fleeing the Saviors.

Supporting cast
 Mo Collins as Sarah Rabinowitz: The adoptive sister of Wendell and a former Marine.
 Daryl Mitchell as Wendell: The adoptive brother of Sarah who uses a wheelchair.
 Matt Frewer as Logan: The former partner of Clayton (aka "Polar Bear") who tricks Morgan's group and seizes the denim factory for himself.
 Bailey Gavulic as Annie: A teenage survivor and sister to Dylan and Max.
 Ethan Suess as Max: A teenage survivor and brother to Annie and Dylan.
 Cooper Dodson as Dylan: Annie and Max's younger brother.
 Mikala Gibson as Doris: Logan's right-hand woman.
 Sydney Lemmon as Isabelle: A CRM pilot who befriends Althea.
 Peggy Schott as Tess: A woman who lived with her son and husband and had never left home until her husband died.
 Colby Hollman as Wes: A nihilistic painter who allies with Morgan's group.
 Peter Jacobson as Jacob Kessner: A rabbi who joins Morgan's group.
 Colby Minifie as Virginia: An antagonistic leader of the Pioneers.
 Holly Curran as Janis: A woman who called Alicia and Strand for help and was saved by Wes. She later joined Morgan's group. She is Tom's sister.
 Joe Massingill as Tom: A man who was being wanted by Virginia and who stole gas from Morgan and Al. He later joined Morgan's group. He is the brother of Janis.

Episodes

Production
In July 2018, AMC renewed the series for a fifth season. Andrew Chambliss and Ian Goldberg have been the showrunners since the fourth season.

Casting
In December 2018, it was reported that Rubén Blades would return in the fifth season as Daniel Salazar. It was also reported that Daniel Sharman would return as Troy Otto, however, in April 2019, showrunner Ian Goldberg confirmed he would not return, stating "Yes, that's just a rumor. We thought he was awesome on the show, but he's not returning." In January 2019, it was reported that Austin Amelio would join the cast as Dwight, who last appeared in the eighth season of The Walking Dead. Alexa Nisenson was promoted to the main cast after recurring in the fourth season as Charlie. In March 2019, it was reported that Karen David had been added to the main cast as Grace.

Filming
Filming for the fifth season began in December 2018 in New Braunfels, Texas. It was reported that Sarah Wayne Callies, who played Lori Grimes on its companion series The Walking Dead, would direct an episode of the season, however, she was not able to due to scheduling conflicts.

Reception

Critical response
The fifth season received mixed reviews from critics and generally negative reviews from audiences. On Rotten Tomatoes, the season has a rating of 55% based on 9 reviews, with an average rating of 5.10/10. The site's critical consensus reads, "Despite delivering some memorable and splatter-filled zombie set-pieces that fans crave, Fear the Walking Dead feels stiff with early-onset rigor mortis in a fifth season that emphasizes altruism over coherent characterization."

Fan response
Following the airing of the season's penultimate episode, a Change.org petition had attracted media attention. Drawing comparisons to a petition to rewrite the last season of Game of Thrones a few months prior, the petition was to fire current showrunners Ian Goldberg and Andrew Chambliss. Chambliss responded to the negative fan reaction by saying, "You know, we told the story that we believe in and we're proud of what we did and in terms of going forward, the show is changing and that's always been part of the plan. You know, it changes every season and every half season and we're very excited about the direction it's going and a lot of the tough challenges that our characters ahead are going to be facing."

Ratings

References

External links
 
 

2019 American television seasons
05
Television shows set in New Braunfels, Texas